Sarah Anne Freeman Clarke (1808-1896) was an American painter with a connection to the Boston Transcendentalist Movement.

Biography

Clarke was born in Massachusetts in 1808. Her brother was the Unitarian minister James Freeman Clarke. She was involved in the Transcendentalist Movement.

In 1843 Clarke traveled with her brother James and mutual friend Margaret Fuller to the area of the Great Lakes and the territories of Wisconsin and Illinois. Fuller wrote and Clarke illustrated the journey in the book Summer on the Lakes in 1843.

Clarke  exhibited her work at the Woman's Building at the 1893 World's Columbian Exposition in Chicago, Illinois. 

She died in 1896.

References

External links

images of Clarke's art on ArtNet
selection of Clarke's letters and a sketch Digital Commonwealth, Massachusetts Collections Online

1808 births
1896 deaths
19th-century American women artists
Artists from Massachusetts